Amritsar Lok Sabha constituency is one of the 13 Lok Sabha (parliamentary) constituencies in the Indian state of Punjab, represented since the 2014 general election by Amarinder Singh of the Congress party. Before that, it had been held by Navjot Singh Sidhu since 2004.

The  Minister of Finance of India(2014-2019), Arun Jaitley, unsuccessfully contested this constituency for the BJP in 2014.

Assembly segments
Amritsar Lok Sabha constituency comprises nine Vidhan Sabha (legislative assembly) segments, which are:

Old assembly segments
These are the assembly segments which underwent boundary delimitation

Verka
2002 Raj Kumar Verka

Members of Parliament

^ by-poll

Election results

2019 
:

Bye-Election - 2017

2014 
:

General Election - 2009 
:

By-Election - 2007 
:

General Election - 2004 
:

General Election - 1999

General Election - 1998

General Election - 1996

See also
 Amritsar district
 List of Constituencies of the Lok Sabha

References

External links
Amritsar lok sabha  constituency election 2019 result details

Lok Sabha constituencies in Punjab, India
Amritsar district